Alicia Kok Shun (born 20 November 2004) is a Mauritian swimmer. She competed in the women's 100 metre breaststroke at the 2020 Summer Olympics.

References

External links
 

2004 births
Living people
Mauritian female swimmers
Olympic swimmers of Mauritius
Swimmers at the 2020 Summer Olympics
Mauritian people of Chinese descent
Sportspeople of Chinese descent
Swimmers at the 2022 Commonwealth Games
Commonwealth Games competitors for Mauritius
21st-century Mauritian people